The 2020 West Coast Conference men's soccer season is the 33rd season of men's varsity soccer in the conference. The season, originally scheduled to begin on August 30, 2020 and conclude on November 6, 2020 was postponed to spring 2021 due to the COVID-19 pandemic. Consequently, the season will begin on February 3, 2021 and conclude on April 11, 2021. The first set of conference games are scheduled for February 28, 2021.

The defending champions are the Saint Mary's Gaels who won the regular season last year (the conference does not host a tournament).

Previous season 

The 2019 season began on August 29, 2019 and concluded on November 12, 2019. Saint Mary's won the regular season, and earned the conference's automatic berth into the NCAA Tournament. Loyola Marymount, the WCC runners-up, earned an at-large bid into the tournament. Saint Mary's earned a first-round bye, and was seeded 12th-overall in the tournament while Loyola Marymount entered in the first round. Loyola Marymount hosted Seattle in the first round and lost 1-3. Saint Mary's hosted UCSB in the second round and lost 0-4.

Anders Engebretsen and Miguel Berry were named Co-Players of the Year for the conference. Filippo Zattarin won the Defensive Player of the Year Award. Remi Prieur was named Goalkeeper of the Year; Noel Caliskan was named Rookie of the Year, and finally, Adam Cooper was named Coach of the Year. 

Miguel Berry was selected by Columbus Crew with the 7th overall pick in the 2020 MLS SuperDraft. Chicago Fire drafted Jonathan Jimenez in the first round with the 26th overall pick. Rey Ortiz, Remi Prieur, and Anders Engebretsen were drafted in the Draft.

Teams

Stadiums and locations

Head coaches

Preseason

WCC Media Poll 
To be announced.

All-WCC Preseason Team 
To be announced.

Regular season

Weekly results 
Legend

All times Eastern time.

Week 1 (Feb. 3 – Feb. 7)
To be determined.

Week 2 (Feb. 8 – Feb. 14)
To be determined.

Week 3 (Feb. 15 – Feb. 21)
To be determined.

Week 4 (Feb. 22 – Feb. 28)
To be determined.

Week 5 (Mar. 1 – Mar. 7)
To be determined.

Week 6 (Mar. 8 – Mar. 14)
To be determined.

Week 7 (Mar. 15 – Mar. 21)
To be determined.

Week 8 (Mar. 22 – Mar. 28)
To be determined.

Week 9 (Mar. 29 – Apr. 4)
To be determined.

Week 10 (Apr. 5 – Apr. 11)
To be determined.

Rankings

National

Far West Regional

Postseason

NCAA Tournament 

The WCC regular season winner will qualify for the NCAA Tournament. Other teams can still earn an at-large bid into the tournament.

Postseason awards and honors

2021 MLS Draft

The 2021 MLS SuperDraft will be held on January 21, 2021.

Homegrown players 

The Homegrown Player Rule is a Major League Soccer program that allows MLS teams to sign local players from their own development academies directly to MLS first team rosters. Before the creation of the rule in 2008, every player entering Major League Soccer had to be assigned through one of the existing MLS player allocation processes, such as the MLS SuperDraft.

To place a player on its homegrown player list, making him eligible to sign as a homegrown player, players must have resided in that club's home territory and participated in the club's youth development system for at least one year. Players can play college soccer and still be eligible to sign a homegrown contract.

References 

2020 NCAA Division I men's soccer season
2020
Association football events postponed due to the COVID-19 pandemic